Aurora Elvira Williams Baussa (born 13 August 1962) is a Chilean business engineer. She was the Chilean Minister of Mining from 11 March 2014 to 11 March 2016.

Education
Williams studied commercial engineering at the Catholic University of the North and earned a Master's degree from the University of Lleida in Business Administration and Management.

Career
During  from 2006–2010, Williams served as a regional ministerial secretary of public works in Antofagasta. This role made her the official responsible for the reconstruction in the area of the city following the 2007 Tocopilla earthquake. later, she worked as an administrative and financial manager for the Antofagasta Terminal International (ATI), a mining company that handled 60% of all mining shipments in Antofagasta Region.

In March 2014, Williams became Minister of Mining, making her the second woman to hold the post since Karen Poniachik.

During her term as Minister of Mining, Williams repealed the Ley Reservada del Cobre, approved capital funding for the COCHILCO from Codelco, and passed legislation for small copper mining businesses. She was also responsible for the closure of the controversial Chilean-Argentine Pascua Lama and the Dominga projects, and for the rescue of two miners following a flood in a mine in Chile Chico.

Citations

Living people
1962 births
Catholic University of the North alumni
Chilean Ministers of Mining
Radical Social Democratic Party of Chile politicians
University of Lleida alumni
People from Antofagasta
Grand Cross of the Order of Civil Merit